Dmitri Ivanovich Chigazov (born 29 June 1983) is a former Russian football player.

Club career
He played in the Russian Football National League for FC Kristall Smolensk in 2001.

International career
He represented Russia at the 2000 UEFA European Under-16 Championship.

External links
 

1983 births
Footballers from Saint Petersburg
Living people
Russian footballers
Russia youth international footballers
Association football goalkeepers
FK Daugava (2003) players
RSK Dižvanagi players
FC Kristall Smolensk players
FC Rubin Kazan players
Latvian Higher League players
Russian expatriate footballers
Expatriate footballers in Latvia